Altstadt, German for "old town", is a historical city centre.

Altstadt may also refer to:
Altstadt (Düsseldorf), a bar quarter in Düsseldorf, Germany
Altstadt (Frankfurt am Main), a quarter in the Ortsbezirk Innenstadt
Altstadt (Königsberg), a quarter of central Königsberg, Germany
Altstadt (München), a part of Munich, Germany
Altstadt Salzburg, the historic city centre of Salzburg, Austria
Altstadt Spandau, the historic centre of Spandau, Berlin
Altstadt (Zürich), the old town of Zürich, Switzerland
Altstadt Church, a medieval church in Königsberg, Germany
Altstadt Gymnasium, a secondary school in Königsberg, Germany

See also
Altstadt-Nord, a part of Innenstadt, Cologne